Fizzle may refer to:
Fizzle (nuclear explosion), a nuclear weapons term
Luke's Fireworks Fizzle, a 1916 short comedy film
Fizzle Promotions, a Music promoters
Battle of Fort Fizzle, an American Civil War
Fizzle Like A Flood, a moniker Doug Kabourek
Fizzles, a short stories by Samuel Beckett
Fizzle (Transformers), a fictional character, member of the Sparkabots 
Fizzle (Yu-Gi-Oh), a term hated by judges but real.

FizzleMusic, A Aspiring Artist With A Dream.

See also
Frizzle (disambiguation)